Patrick Carfizzi (born April 10, 1974) is an American operatic bass-baritone.

Early life and education
Carfizzi is a native of Newburgh, New York, and began his studies with Sharon Christman at the Catholic University of America; further study followed with Doris and Richard Cross at Yale University before he spent three summers as an apprentice artist at Santa Fe Opera, where he debuted as Antonio in Le nozze di Figaro in 2000.

Career
He bowed at the Metropolitan Opera as the Count Ceprano in Rigoletto in 1999, and has regularly returned to the house in such roles as Schaunard in La bohème; the Mandarin in Turandot; Masetto in Don Giovanni; Paolo in Simon Boccanegra; Brander in La damnation de Faust; and Peter Quince in Benjamin Britten's A Midsummer Night's Dream. , he had appeared with the company nearly 400 times. In 2001 he bowed at San Francisco Opera, portraying the Marquis d'Obigny in La traviata.

At Seattle Opera he debuted in 2006 as Frank in Die Fledermaus. At Lyric Opera of Chicago he first appeared in the 2015–16 season, playing Zeta in The Merry Widow.

Other organizations with which he has appeared include the Boston Symphony, the Canadian Opera Company, the Dallas Opera, Houston Grand Opera, Minnesota Opera, the Opera Theatre of St. Louis, and the Seattle Symphony Orchestra.

His European debut came in 2011, when he sang Leporello at the Cologne Opera.

Philanthropy
Active as well as a philanthropist, in 2009 he founded Arts-LEAF, a nonprofit dedicated to providing mentoring in the arts.

References

1974 births
20th-century American LGBT people
21st-century American male opera singers
American expatriates in Belgium
American operatic bass-baritones
Catholic University of America alumni
Classical musicians from New York (state)
American LGBT singers
LGBT classical musicians
LGBT people from New York (state)
Living people
People from Newburgh, New York
Singers from New York (state)
Yale University alumni